Cockburn is a town and locality in the east of the Australian state of South Australia immediately adjacent to the border with New South Wales near Broken Hill.

Huge ore deposits were discovered in Silverton, which in 1884 prompted the government of South Australia to offer to the Government of New South Wales the building of a narrow gauge railway line from the limit of its jurisdiction at the border to Silverton, since horse-drawn drays over rough tracks could not meet the transport task for the journey to Port Pirie. This offer was rejected by the New South Wales government. In response, investors formed the Silverton Tramway Company in 1885 to build the railway line from Silverton to the border. The town of Cockburn came into existence in 1886 on the South Australia side of the border as a place for trains to exchange locomotives and crews. On the New South Wales side of the border, the Silverton Tramway Company built a station and sidings, called Burns.

Pressure for the expansion of Cockburn was increased with mineral discoveries at Thackaringa and Umberumberka from 1883 onwards. The silver-lead-zinc discovery at Broken Hill led to the railway line being extended from Silverton to Broken Hill in 1887. The route was extremely important, as it provided balanced trading for locomotives with a momentum grade 'up' from Broken Hill to Cockburn and a rising grade 'down' from Cockburn to Broken Hill. This was the main advantage of the route to and from Cockburn.

By 1892, the town of Cockburn had become sizable. The population was 2,000 people. Cockburn boasted two hotels, two general stores, three boarding houses, schools and churches. It contained within its business sector a blacksmith, butcher, baker, produce merchant and carrier. Stationed at Cockburn were two engineers, a stationmaster, customs officer, locomotive superintendent and a miner. A locomotive shed and related work facilities were recorded as existing in 1892. Seven trains regularly ran between Petersburg (now Peterborough), Cockburn and Broken Hill, and included passenger trains. In 1892, 83,194 passengers travelled through Cockburn.

Cockburn also has a role in industrial relations history in Broken Hill. Tom Mann, a political "disruptionist", was barred from speaking publicly in New South Wales. In 1908, 3,000 passengers came from Broken Hill to Cockburn to hear him speak. From the front of the hall, next to the Cockburn Hotel, he addressed the crowd. This was the beginning of a dispute known as the 1909 lockout. Broken Hill mining unionists were locked out of the company gates for rejecting pay cuts which would have been below the minimum wage.

The standard gauge railway line, officially opened in 1970, runs south of the surveyed town limits of Cockburn and has a new station and a passing loop. The "new" station is now disused.

In the early 1990s the South Australian government proposed to close down the small communities along the Barrier Highway, leading to a strong and unified resistance from the local communities. The 2016 census recorded 56 people in the immediate vicinity of the town.

Nothing remains of the infrastructure of the railway yard other than an elevated locomotive water tank, repurposed as a bushfire emergency asset. The last buildings, six railway employee houses, were demolished in 2009.

Governance
Cockburn is located within the federal division of Grey, the state electoral district of Stuart and the Pastoral Unincorporated Area of South Australia. As of 2018, the community within Cockburn received municipal services from a South Australian government agency, the Outback Communities Authority.

References

External links
 Cockburn Progress Association

Towns in South Australia
Borders of South Australia
Borders of New South Wales
Far North (South Australia)
Places in the unincorporated areas of South Australia